Francesco Albanese (13 August 1912 in Torre del Greco, Naples – 11 June 2005 in Rome) was a lyric tenor, particularly associated with the Italian repertory.

Albanese studied in Rome with Francesco Salfi, and made his stage debut in 1940, at the Teatro dell'Opera di Roma, as Evandre in Gluck's Alceste, where he remained until 1942, also singing Almaviva, Fenton, Rinuccio.

In 1942, he made his debut at La Fenice in Venice, as Ramiro, at the Maggio Musicale Fiorentino in Florence, as Don Ottavio, and at the Teatro alla Scala in Milan, as Fenton.

After the war, he began appearing abroad, notably at the Teatro Nacional de São Carlos in Lisbon, the Royal Opera House in London, the Teatro Colón in Buenos Aires, and the Hungarian Opera House in Budapest.

His roles included; Nemorino in L'elisir d'amore, Jeník in Bedřich Smetana's La sposa venduta, Ernesto in Don Pasquale, Ismaele in Nabucco, Faust in Faust, Rodolfo in La bohème, Giuliano in Gustave Charpentier's Luisa, Wolfgang Capito in Paul Hindemith's Mathis il pintore, Avito in Italo Montemezzi's L'amore dei tre re, Giasone in Luigi Cherubini's Medea, Pilade in Christoph Willibald Gluck's Iphigénie en Tauride and Rinaldo in Gioachino Rossini's Armida, etc.

Albanese had a fine, well-schooled voice. He can be heard on record in Armida (1952), La traviata (1953) and Iphigénie en Tauride (1957), in each of these opposite Maria Callas.

Sources
Grove Music Online, Elizabeth Forbes, Oxford University Press, April 2008.

External links
http://www.naxos.com/artistinfo/bio7007.htm

1912 births
2005 deaths
Musicians from Naples
Italian operatic tenors
People from Torre del Greco
20th-century Italian male opera singers